State Colours of the Austro-Hungarian states, displayed on their flags.

The list of states, and their flag colors goes:
 Kingdom of Bohemia: red-white
 Lower Austria: blue-yellow
 Duchy of Bukovina: blue-red
 Upper Austria: white-red
 Kingdom of Croatia: red-white-blue
 Duchy of Salzburg: red-white
 Kingdom of Dalmatia: blue-yellow
 Austrian Silesia: yellow-black
 Kingdom of Galicia and Lodomeria: blue-red (to 1849), blue-red-yellow (1849-1890), red-white (1890-1918)
 Transylvania: blue-red-yellow
 Gorizia and Gradisca: white-red
 Kingdom of Slavonia: blue-white-green
 Margraviate of Istria: yellow-red-blue
 Duchy of Styria: green-white
 Duchy of Carinthia: red-white
 Imperial Free City of Trieste: red-white-red
 Duchy of Carniola: white-blue-red
 County of Tyrol: white-red
 Margraviate of Moravia: yellow-red
 Vorarlberg: red-white

Literature 
 Friedrich Heyer von Rosenfeld: "Die See-Flaggen, National und Provincial-Fahnen sowie Cocarden aller Laender : nach offiziellen Quellen zusammengestellt und bearbeitet", Verlag der kaiserlich-königlichen Hof- und Staatsdruckerei, Wien, 1883.

References

Austria-Hungary